XHTC-FM is a radio station on 91.1 FM in Torreón, Coahuila, Mexico. The station is owned by GREM and carries a talk radio format known as Kiuu.

History
XHTC began as XETC-AM 1240, owned by Alonso Gómez Aguirre and signing on in 1961. The station was sold to the Mayran group in 1972, and in 1991 it moved from 1240 to 880.

In 2011 XETC migrated to FM as XHTC-FM 91.1.

References

External links
Kiuu FM 91.1

Radio stations in Coahuila
Radio stations in the Comarca Lagunera